Ayzac-Ost is a commune in the Hautes-Pyrénées department of southwestern France.

Population

See also
Communes of the Hautes-Pyrénées department

References

Communes of Hautes-Pyrénées